Galal Keraitam (January 1913–30 October 1961), was an Egyptian footballer who played as a defender for Zamalek. He also played for the Egyptian national team.

Honours
Zamalek SC
Egypt Cup:
 1943–44
Cairo League:
 1943–44

References

Egyptian footballers
Egypt international footballers
Zamalek SC players
1913 births
1961 deaths
Association football defenders
People from Beheira Governorate